The Gop (also known as Gop Cairn or Gop-y-Goleuni) is a neolithic monument lying within the Clwydian Range,  northwest of  Trelawnyd, in Flintshire, Wales, in the Clwydian Range. There is evidence that there was a considerable amount of stone on the top of hill, which may indicate that it was used as a look-out or hill fort.

Description
Oval in form, it is the second-largest neolithic mound in Britain after Silbury Hill, in Wiltshire. Excavations have discovered prehistoric remains both in the caves below and in the mound itself.

Excavations have uncovered no burial chambers or other underground works, which may indicate that it was used as a look-out or hill fort; there is evidence that there was a considerable amount of stone on the top of hill. In the 17th century, its prominent position allowed a beacon to be placed there.

The mound lies on top of Gop Hill (823 feet), a natural limestone outcrop, in the side of which are the Gop Caves.

References

The Megalithic Portal and Megalith Map
https://allowflowbe.com/wp-admin/post.php?post=389&action=edit

External links
Photograph of the mound with the entrance to Gop Cave in the foreground

Archaeological sites in Flintshire
Scheduled monuments in Flintshire
Mountains and hills of Flintshire
Prehistoric sites in Wales
Mounds